Monica Barbaro (born June 18, 1990) is an American actress. She's known for her film roles in The Cathedral (2021), Top Gun: Maverick (2022), and At Midnight (2023). She's also appeared in leading roles in UnREAL, The Good Cop, and Chicago Justice.

Early life 
Barbaro was born on June 18, 1990, in San Francisco. She grew up in Mill Valley, California, where she graduated from Tamalpais High School in 2007. Her parents divorced when she was a child. Barbaro started dancing at an early age and went on to study ballet. While taking electives in acting, she completed a degree in dance at New York University's Tisch School of the Arts in New York City. After graduating in 2010, she decided to pursue acting and returned to San Francisco. There, she attended the Beverly Hills Playhouse acting school.

Career 
Barbaro gained attention in 2013 for her lead role in It's Not About the Nail, a viral comedy short about communication in a marriage. Her first major television role was portraying the character of Yael on the second season of the Lifetime television series UnREAL. Following UnREAL, Barbaro joined the cast of NBC legal drama Chicago Justice, an entry in Dick Wolf's Chicago franchise, in which she portrayed Anna Valdez. In 2018, Barbaro also played Cora Vasquez on Netflix's The Good Cop, alongside Josh Groban and Tony Danza. Between 2018 and 2019, Barbaro had a recurring part in the ABC sitcom Splitting Up Together. In the 2022 blockbuster Top Gun: Maverick, Barbaro portrayed Lieutenant Natasha "Phoenix" Trace, a naval aviator.

The following year Barbaro starred in the romantic comedy At Midnight (2023). The film received mixed reviews for its story but Barbaro earned acclaim for her performance. San Francisco Chronicle declared "Barbaro...proves with seemingly effortless charm that she can carry a rom-com". Barbaro a professional dancer, was able to lend her talents in a scene that involved the two leads dancing a combination of salsa and the tango.

Though it may have taken a back seat to her acting career, Barbaro shared in an interview that dancing is finding its way back into her life. "I'm bringing it all back because I realized I'm not getting any younger, so if there's a time to break out my dancing, it should be before it's too late."

Filmography

Film

Television

Video games

References

External links 
 
 

Living people
American television actresses
1990 births
21st-century American women
Tamalpais High School alumni
Actresses from San Francisco
People from Mill Valley, California
Tisch School of the Arts alumni
American film actresses